Albert Taylor (17 June 1882 – 16 November 1932) was a British diver. He competed in the men's 3 metre springboard event at the 1908 Summer Olympics.

References

External links

1882 births
1932 deaths
British male divers
Olympic divers of Great Britain
Divers at the 1908 Summer Olympics